Hugh may refer to:

Hugh (given name)

Noblemen and clergy

French

 Hugh the Great (died 956), Duke of the Franks
 Hugh Magnus of France (1007–1025), co-King of France under his father, Robert II
 Hugh, Duke of Alsace (died 895), modern-day France
 Hugh of Austrasia (7th century), Mayor of the Palace of Austrasia
 Hugh I, Count of Angoulême (1183–1249)
 Hugh II, Count of Angoulême (1221–1250)
 Hugh III, Count of Angoulême (13th century)
 Hugh IV, Count of Angoulême (1259–1303)
 Hugh, Bishop of Avranches (11th century), France
 Hugh I, Count of Blois (died 1248)
 Hugh II, Count of Blois (died 1307)
 Hugh of Brienne (1240–1296), Count of the medieval French County of Brienne
 Hugh, Duke of Burgundy (d. 952)
 Hugh I, Duke of Burgundy (1057–1093)
 Hugh II, Duke of Burgundy (1084–1143)
 Hugh III, Duke of Burgundy (1142–1192)
 Hugh IV, Duke of Burgundy (1213–1272)
 Hugh V, Duke of Burgundy (1294–1315)
 Hugh Capet (939–996), King of France
 Hugh, Count of Champagne (c. 1074–1125)
 Hugh of Châteauneuf (1052–1132), Bishop of Grenoble
 Hugh of Cluny (1024–1109), French Abott, later canonized as Saint Hugh the Great
 Hugh I of Cyprus (1195–1218)
 Hugh II of Cyprus (1253–1267)
 Hugh III of Cyprus and Hugh I of Jerusalem (1235–1284)
 Hugh IV of Cyprus (1295–1359)
 Hugh of Die (1040-1106), French papal legate, and Archbishop of Lyon
 Hugh, abbot of Lagny (died 1171), France
 Hugh of Lincoln (1140–1200), aka Hugh of Avalon or Hugh of Burgundy
 Hugh I of Lusignan (early tenth century)
 Hugh II of Lusignan (died 967)
 Hugh III of Lusignan (late tenth century)
 Hugh IV of Lusignan (died 1026)
 Hugh V of Lusignan (died 1060)
 Hugh VI of Lusignan (died 1110)
 Hugh VII of Lusignan (1065–1151)
 Hugh VIII of Lusignan (12th century)
 Hugh IX of Lusignan (1163 or 1168 – 1219)
 Hugh X of Lusignan (1195–1249)
 Hugh XI of Lusignan (1221–1250)
 Hugh XII of Lusignan (13th century)
 Hugh XIII of Lusignan (1259–1303)
 Hugh I, Count of Maine (ruled 900–933)
 Hugh II, Count of Maine (ruled 950–992)
 Hugh III of Maine (960–1015)
 Hugh IV, Count of Maine (died 1051)
 Hugh V, Count of Maine (died 1131)
 Hugh I, Count of Rethel (1040–1118)
 Hugh II, Count of Rethel (died 1227)
 Hugh III of Rethel (1227–1242)
 Hugh IV, Count of Rethel (1244–1285)
 Hugh (abbot of Saint-Quentin) (802–844), France
 Hugh, Count of Soissons (died 1305), France
 Hugh, Count of Toulouse (died 978), France
 Hugh (archbishop of Vienne) (died 1155), France

Anglo-Norman/English

 Hugh (Dean of York), first Dean of York
 Hugh d'Avranches, 1st Earl of Chester  (died 1101)
 Hugh Bigod, 1st Earl of Norfolk (1095–1177), second son of Roger Bigod, Sheriff of Norfolk
 Hugh de Kevelioc, 3rd Earl of Chester (1147–1181)
 Hugh Bigod, 3rd Earl of Norfolk (1182–1225), eldest son of Roger Bigod, Sheriff of Norfolk
 Hugh le Despencer (justiciar) (1223–1265), Baron le Despencer
 Hugh le Despenser (sheriff) (died 1238), High Sheriff of Berkshire
 Hugh le Despenser, 1st Earl of Winchester (1261–1326)
 Hugh the younger Despenser (1286–1326), son of Hugh le Despenser, Earl of Winchester
 Hugh, Baron Dacre of Glanton Trevor-Roper (1914–2003), a British historian
 Hugh Percy (disambiguation)
 Hugh Seymour (disambiguation)

Gaelic
 Hugh of Sleat (died 1498), chieftain of Clan Donald
 Hugh O'Neill, 2nd Earl of Tyrone (1540–1616), Irish chieftain who resisted the annexation of Ireland by Elizabeth I of England
 Hugh Roe O'Donnell (1572–1602), Prince of Tyrconnell, led a rebellion against English government in Ireland
 Hugh Dubh O'Neill (1611–1660), Irish soldier who commanded the defenders in the Siege of Clonmel and Siege of Limerick
 Hugh O'Neill, 1st Baron Rathcavan (1883–1982), Ulster Unionist politician who served as Father of the House of Commons

The Gaelic name Aodh/Aedh/Aed is often translated into English as Hugh. Persons sharing this name who traditionally use the Gaelic form are listed below:

 Áed Rúad, legendary High king of Ireland
 Áed mac Echach (died 575), king of Connacht
 Áed Dub mac Suibni (died 588), king of Dál nAraidi
 Áed Dibchine (died c.595), king of Leinster
 Áed mac Ainmuirech (died 598), High king of Ireland
 Áed Sláine (died 604), High king of Ireland
 Áed Rón mac Cathail (died 604), king in Leinster
 Áed Uaridnach (died 612), High king of Ireland
 Áed Bennán mac Crimthainn (died 618), king of or in Munster
 Áed Dub mac Colmáin (died 639), bishop of Kildare
 Áed Aired (died 698), king of Dál nAraide
 Áed Róin (died 735), king of Dál Fiatach
 Áed mac Colggen (died 738), king of Leinster
 Áed Balb mac Indrechtaig (died 742), king of Connacht
 Áed Muinderg (died 747), king of northern Uí Néill
 Áed Find (died 778), king of Dál Riata
 Áed Oirdnide (died 819), king of Ailech
 Áed mac Boanta (died 839), probably king in Dál Riata
 Áed of Scotland (died 878), king of the Picts
 Áed Findliath (died 879), king of Ailech
 Áed Ua Crimthainn (mid 12th century), abbot of Terryglass
 Aedh mac Cathal Crobdearg Ua Conchobair (13th century), king of Connacht
 Aedh Muimhnech mac Felim Ua Conchobair (13th century), king of Connacht
 Aedh mac Ruaidri Ua Conchobair (13th century), king of Connacht
 Aedh mac Aedh Breifneach Ua Conchobair (14th century)
 Aodh, Earl of Ross (died 1333)

Other
 Hugh of Arles or Hugh of Provence (10th century), King of Italy
 Hugh, Margrave of Tuscany aka Hugo or Ugo (950–1001), Italy
 Hugh, Count of Suio (1023–1040), Count of Suio in the Duchy of Gaeta, Italy
 Hugh of Saint Victor  (1078–1141), mystic philosopher
 Hugh of Ibelin (12th century), noble in the Kingdom of Jerusalem
 Hugh of Jabala (12th century), bishop of Jabala, Syria
 Hugh (archbishop of Edessa) (died 1144), Upper Mesopotamia
 Hugh (archbishop of Palermo) (died c. 1165/6)

Characters
Hugh (Kiba)
Hugh (Star Trek)
Hugh Neutron, a Jimmy Neutron character

Other uses
Hugh (hill), or Hill Under Graham Height, a category of Scottish hills
 Hugh Lake
 Hugh (robot), an artificial intelligence robot librarian
 Hugh, Northern Territory, a locality in Australia

See also
 HEW (disambiguation)
 Hughes (disambiguation)
Hughs (disambiguation)
 Hugo (disambiguation)
 Hugues (disambiguation)
 Ugo (disambiguation), the Italian form
 HUW (disambiguation)
 Hue (disambiguation)